Kuruvikulam is a panchayat in southern Tamil Nadu. This panchayat is located in Kuruvikulam Block, Thiruvenkatam taluk, Tenkasi district. The nearest railway station for kuruvikulam is sankarankovil town(15 km).

Agriculture and safety matches are the major works of kuruvikulam people's. In Kuruvikulam there are two most famous temples. They are Meenakshi Sundareswarar Temple and Kuruvikulam Karuppasamy Temple with Siththan kaatha Ayyanaar Temple.
And also there is a mountain temple named Aanamalai Ayyanaar Temple, that is a popular tourist place. And also the nearest tourist spot of Kuruvikulam is "Ellora of southern" 'Vettuvaan Rock Temple' located at Kalugumalai. This village located as per the government map was 20 km away from kanyakumari - bangalore highways NH7, and 3 km away from Tuticorin - Kuttralam State highway.

After the battle of Talikota, one section of Gandikota Pemmasani Nayaks family migrated to Tamil Nadu and established Kuruvikulam Zamindari. This is the most prominent Zamindari estate in Tamil Nadu. It existed from 1565 to 1949.

References 

Villages in Tirunelveli district
Palayam